During the 1850s and 1860s, engineers carried out a piecemeal raising of the level of central Chicago to lift it out of low-lying swampy ground. Streets, sidewalks, and buildings were physically raised on jackscrews. The work was funded by private property owners and public funds.

Background 

During the 19th century, the elevation of the Chicago area was little higher than the shoreline of Lake Michigan; for many years, there was little or no naturally occurring drainage from the city surface. The lack of drainage caused unpleasant living conditions and standing water harbored pathogens that caused numerous epidemics, including typhoid fever and dysentery, which blighted Chicago six years in a row, culminating in the 1854 outbreak of cholera that killed six percent of the city’s population.

The crisis forced the city's engineers and aldermen to take the drainage problem seriously and after many heated discussions—and following at least one false start—a solution eventually materialized. In 1856, engineer Ellis S. Chesbrough drafted a plan for the installation of a citywide sewerage system and submitted it to the Common Council, which adopted the plan. Workers then laid drains, covered and refinished roads and sidewalks with several feet of soil, and raised most buildings to the new grade.

Earliest raising of a brick building 

The contractor was an engineer from Boston, James Brown, who went on to partner with Chicago engineer James Hollingsworth; Brown and Hollingsworth became the first and, it seems, the busiest building raising partnership in the city.

The Row on Lake Street 

In 1860, a consortium of no fewer than six engineers—including Brown, Hollingsworth and George Pullman—co-managed a project to raise half a city block on Lake Street, between Clark Street and LaSalle Street complete and in one go. Businesses operating in these premises were not closed down during the operation; as the buildings were being raised, people came, went, shopped and worked in them as they would ordinarily do. In five days the entire assembly was elevated  by a team consisting of six hundred men using six thousand jackscrews, ready for new foundation walls to be built underneath. The spectacle drew crowds of thousands, who were on the final day permitted to walk at the old ground level, among the jacks.

The Tremont House 

The following year a team led by Ely, Smith, and Pullman raised the Tremont House hotel on the south-east corner of Lake Street and Dearborn Street. Once again business as usual was maintained as this large hotel ascended, and some of the guests staying there at the time—among whose number were several VIPs and a US Senator—were oblivious to the process as five hundred men worked under covered trenches operating their five thousand jackscrews. One patron was puzzled to note that the front steps leading from the street into the hotel were becoming steeper every day and that when he checked out, the windows were several feet above his head, whereas before they had been at eye level. This hotel building, which until just the previous year had been the tallest building in Chicago, was raised  without incident.

The Robbins Building 

This was a very heavy building; its ornate iron frame, its twelve-inch (305 mm) thick masonry wall filling, and its “floors filled with heavy goods” made for a weight estimated at 27,000 tons (24,000 metric tons), a large load to raise over a relatively small area. The complete mass of iron and masonry was raised , “without the slightest crack or damage.”

Hydraulic raising of the Franklin House 

There is evidence in primary document sources that at least one building in Chicago, the Franklin House on Franklin Street, was raised hydraulically by the engineer John C. Lane, of the Lane and Stratton partnership of San Francisco. Californian engineers had been using hydraulic jacks to raise brick buildings in and around San Francisco as early as 1853.

Relocated buildings 

Many of central Chicago’s hurriedly-erected wooden frame buildings were now considered inappropriate to the burgeoning and increasingly wealthy city. Rather than raise them several feet, proprietors often preferred to relocate these old frame buildings, replacing them with new masonry blocks built to the latest grade. Consequently, the practice of putting the old multi-story, intact and furnished wooden buildings—sometimes entire rows of them en bloc—on rollers and moving them to the outskirts of town or to the suburbs was so common as to be considered nothing more than routine traffic. Traveller David Macrae wrote, “Never a day passed during my stay in the city that I did not meet one or more houses shifting their quarters. One day I met nine. Going out Great Madison Street in the horse cars we had to stop twice to let houses get across.” The function for which such a building had been constructed would often be maintained during the move. A family could begin dining at one address and end their meal at another, and a shop owner could keep their shop open, even as customers had to climb in through a moving front door. Brick buildings also were moved from one location to another, and in 1866, the first of these—a brick building of two and a half stories—made the short move from Madison Street out to Monroe Street. Later, many other much larger brick buildings were rolled much greater distances across Chicago.

See also 
Regrading in Seattle
Seattle Underground
Underground Atlanta

References

External links 
 The Lifting of Chicago: Source Documents Primary Document Sources.
 Raising Chicago: An Illustrated History

History of Chicago
Sewerage
Civil engineering
Building engineering
1850s in Illinois
1860s in Illinois